Shamrock Rovers Football Club are a football club from Dublin, Ireland. They compete in the League of Ireland and are the most successful club in the history of football in the Republic of Ireland, having won 20 League of Ireland titles and 25 FAI Cups.

They have also won the League of Ireland Shield on 18 occasions and the League of Ireland Cup once. Shamrock Rovers have supplied more players to the Republic of Ireland national football team (64) than any other single club. This list comprises the major honours won by Shamrock Rovers and the records set by the players and managers of the club.

Honours

National titles
 League of Ireland: 20 (record)
1922–23, 1924–25, 1926–27, 1931–32, 1937–38, 1938–39, 1953–54, 1956–57, 1958–59, 1963–64  1983–84, 1984–85, 1985–86, 1986–87, 1993–94, 2010, 2011, 2020, 2021, 2022 
FAI Cup: 25 (record)
1925, 1929, 1930, 1931, 1932, 1933, 1936, 1940, 1944, 1945, 1948, 1955, 1956, 1962, 1964, 1965, 1966,  1967, 1968, 1969, 1978, 1985, 1986, 1987, 2019                      
League of Ireland Shield: 18
1924–25, 1926–27, 1931–32, 1932–33, 1934–35, 1937–38, 1941–42, 1949–50, 1951–52, 1954–55, 1955–56,  1956–57, 1957–58, 1962–63, 1963–64, 1964–65, 1965–66, 1967–68.
League of Ireland Cup: 2
1976–77
2013
League of Ireland First Division: 1
2006
Setanta Sports Cup: 2
2011 Setanta Sports Cup
2013 Setanta Sports Cup

Regional titles
Leinster Senior Cup: 18
1923, 1927, 1929, 1930, 1933, 1938, 1953, 1955, 1956, 1957, 1958, 1964, 1969, 1982, 1985, 1997, 2012, 2013

 Complete list of honours

European record
Shamrock Rovers have a long history in European competition. They were the first Irish side to enter European competition, and featured regularly in the 1960s and 1980s. The club has had some relative success with victories in the Intertoto-Cup and the Europa League. Throughout their participation Rovers have beaten teams from Luxembourg, Cyprus, Iceland and Germany, and were the first Irish club to beat teams from Turkey, Poland, Israel, Serbia Slovakia, Albania and Hungary. Their first victory in the UEFA Champions League came in a 1–0 victory in the 2011–12 qualifying phase against FC Flora Tallinn at Tallaght Stadium .

Their biggest win was a 7–0 aggregate victory (3–0 away, 4–0 home) over Fram Reykjavik in the UEFA Cup first round in September 1982, which remains a record for League of Ireland clubs in European competition.

On 25 August 2011, they became the first Irish team to qualify for the UEFA Europa League group stage when they defeated Partizan Belgrade 2–1 after extra-time in Serbia, for a 3–2 aggregate victory.

Rovers qualified for the group stages of the 2022–23 UEFA Europa Conference League

Some of their more notable European performances include:

 a 2–2 draw and 1–0 defeat to defending champions and finalists, Valencia CF in Inter-Cities Fairs Cup 1963–64
 a 1–1 draw and 2–1 defeat to finalists, Real Zaragoza in the Inter-Cities Fairs Cup 1965–66
 a 1–1 draw and 3–2 defeat to winners, Bayern Munich in the UEFA Cup Winners' Cup 1966–67
 a 2–1 win over FC Schalke 04 in the UEFA Cup Winners' Cup 1969–70
 a 2–1 win and 1–0 win over Odra Wodzisław in the UEFA Intertoto Cup 2003
 a 1-0 win over Bnei Yehuda in Tel Aviv in the 2010–11 UEFA Europa League.
 a 2-1 win over Partizan Belgrade in Belgrade in the 2011–12 UEFA Europa League play-off round to make history by becoming the first Irish team to qualify for the UEFA Europa League group stage.

Overview 
''Correct as of December 2022

Exhibition games

Notable results
 5–1 win against Red Star Belgrade, 16/7/1961, Polo Grounds, New York (Scorers: Tony Byrne (2), Frank O'Neill, Paddy Ambrose, Liam Tuohy).
 1–0 win against Sporting Clube de Portugal, 16/8/1985, Estádio José Alvalade (1956) (Scorer: Harry Kenny)
 1–0 win against Arsenal, 25/2/1986, Glenmalure Park (Scorer: Noel Larkin).
 2–0 win against Manchester United, 14/8/1986, Shay Brennan testimonial, Glenmalure Park (Scorers: Michael Bennett (footballer), Liam O'Brien).

Team records

 The club's 1000th League win came on Friday 18 August 2006 when Kilkenny City were beaten 2–0 at Tolka Park with goals by Anthony Flood and Tadhg Purcell.

At the end of the 2022 season the club's overall League record is:

Padraig Amond scored Rovers 4000th League goal on 14 September 2007 in a 4–0 win over Galway United.

Player statistics

Goalscorers
 Highest number of league goals in a season: 
 Bob Fullam – 1922–23 (27)
 Gary Twigg – 2009 (24)
 Stephen Geoghegan – 1993–94 (23)
 Top League scorers
 Paddy Ambrose – 109
 Paddy Coad – 104
 Bob Fullam – 92
 Top FAI Cup scorers
 Paddy Coad – 37
 Liam Tuohy – 20

References

Bibliography

External links
Shamrock Rovers FC Website

Records And Statistics
Shamrock Rovers